Monte Hacho is a low mountain that overlooks the Spanish city of Ceuta, on the north coast of Africa. Monte Hacho is positioned on the Mediterranean coast at the Strait of Gibraltar opposite Gibraltar, and along with the Rock of Gibraltar is claimed by some to be one of the Pillars of Hercules (the other candidate for the southern pillar being Jebel Musa). According to the legend, Hercules pushed apart the two mountains and created a link between the Mediterranean and the Atlantic.

In classical civilization it was possibly known as Mons Abila (Mount Abila or Abyla), although this title could refer to Jebel Musa instead.

Monte Hacho is located on the Península de Almina and topped by a fort, the Fortaleza de Hacho, which was first built by the Byzantines, before being added to by the Arabs, Portuguese and Spanish. It is now occupied by the Spanish army. Monte Hacho also has a convent, Ermita de San Antonio, and Monumento del Llano Amarillo which is a monument to Generalisimo Francisco Franco and the start of the Spanish Civil War in North Africa in 1936.

References

External links

 Images of Fortaleza de Hacho

Hacho
Pillars of Hercules